Sean Ryan is an Irish hurler who plays club hurling for Templederry Kenyons and at inter-county level with the Tipperary senior hurling team.

Career
On 4 February 2023, Ryan made his league debut for Tipperary in the opening round of the 2023 National Hurling League against Laois as Tipperary won by 2–32 to 0–18.

References

Living people
Tipperary inter-county hurlers
Year of birth missing (living people)